23 August is celebrated as the Day of the National Flag ( Day of the National Flag of Ukraine) in Ukraine; beginning in 2004. 24 July was previously marked as National Flag Day in Kyiv. The first ceremonial raising of the yellow-and-blue Ukrainian flag in modern times took place on 24 July 1990 at the flagstaff of the Kyiv City Council, one-and-a-half years before the flag was officially adopted as the National flag of the Ukrainian state (early 1992).

Since 1992 Independence Day of Ukraine is celebrated on 24 August.
According to the official version, on August 23, 1991 — after the failure of the putsch in Moscow — a group of people's deputies brought a blue-yellow Ukrainian flag into the session hall of the Verkhovna Rada. The consecration of the flag was conducted by the priest of the UAOC Peter Boyk. The Decree of the President of Ukraine, L. Kuchma, "On the Day of the State Flag of Ukraine" No. 987/2004 was tied to this event, a corresponding picture was painted on the wall of the VRU, and this flag, like a relic, is solemnly kept under glass in the VRU museum. The next day, Ukraine declared independence.

Historically the blue-yellow flag is first verifiably documented on 25 June 1848 when the Supreme Ruthenian Council hoisted it over the Lviv (Lemberg) Townhall (Rathaus).

References

External link

Ukrainian culture
Society of Ukraine
2004 establishments in Ukraine
Flag of Ukraine
Ukraine
Observances in Ukraine

Summer events in Ukraine